Buyeo Pung (扶餘豊, 623–668) was a prince of Baekje, one of the Three Kingdoms of Korea. He was son of the last king, Uija of Baekje. When Baekje fell to the Silla–Tang alliance in 660, he was a hostage who mortgaged the alliance of Baekje with Japan. He was shortly unofficially proclaimed king.

He came back with a Japanese army and Yamato general Abe no Hirafu to revive the country. General Boksin of the Baekje revival forces gave him the title King Pungjang (풍장왕, 豊璋王). He joined forces with the Baekje resistance led by general Boksin. In 663, however, the Baekje resistance and Japan lost the Battle of Baekgang to the army of Tang and Silla, and Baekje collapsed. The prince fled to neighboring Goguryeo. When Goguryeo collapsed, he was captured by the Tang army and sent to southern China in exile. His later life is unknown.

One of his brothers, Zenkō (善光 or 禅広), settled in Japan and was given the family name Kudara no Konikishi (百濟王; king of Baekje) by the emperor of Japan.

Popular culture
 Portrayed by Jang Tae-sung in the 2012-2013 KBS1 TV series Dream of the Emperor.

See also 
 Uija of Baekje
 Buyeo Yung
 Silla–Tang alliance
 History of Korea
 Three Kingdoms of Korea
 List of monarchs of Korea

Notes 

Baekje rulers
Korean exiles
Year of death unknown
623 births